Lin Wai Phyo Latt (born 1 June 1980) is a Burmese politician who currently serves as a House of Nationalities member of parliament for Tanintharyi No. 5 constituency. He is a member of National League for Democracy.

Early life and education 
Lin was born on 1 June 1980 in Myeik, Myanmar. He graduated M.B.B.S from University of Medicine, Yangon. His former work is Medical Doctor.

Political career
Lin was elected as an Amyotha Hluttaw MP, winning a majority of 46,420 votes from Tanintharyi Region No.5 parliamentary constituency.

He also serves as a member of Amyotha Hluttaw Health, Sports and Culture Committee.

References

National League for Democracy politicians
1980 births
Living people
People from Tanintharyi Region